The Vermont Wing of the Civil Air Patrol (CAP) is the highest echelon of Civil Air Patrol in the state of Vermont. Vermont Wing headquarters are located at 355 Vally Road South Burlington, Vermont. The Vermont Wing consists of over 150 cadet and adult members at over 7 locations across the state of Vermont.

Mission
The Vermont Wing executes the three missions of the Civil Air Patrol: providing emergency services; offering cadet programs for youth; and providing aerospace education for Civil Air Patrol members and the public.

Emergency services

The Civil Air Patrol provides emergency services, which includes performing search and rescue and disaster relief missions; assisting in humanitarian aid assignments; and providing Air Force support through conducting light transport, communications support, and low-altitude route surveys. The Civil Air Patrol offers support to counter-drug missions.

Cadet programs
The Civil Air Patrol runs cadet programs for youth aged 12 to 21, which cover materials such as aerospace education, leadership training, physical fitness and moral leadership.

Aerospace education
The Civil Air Patrol offers aerospace education for Civil Air Patrol members and the general public. The education is provided through the training offered to the cadets of CAP, and also through teaching workshops for youth throughout the nation through schools and public aviation events.

Organization

See also
Vermont Air National Guard
Vermont State Guard

References

External links
Vermont Wing Civil Air Patrol official website
Capital Composite Squadron official website
Catamount Composite Squadron official website
Rutland Composite Squadron Civil Air Patrol official website

Wings of the Civil Air Patrol
Education in Vermont
Military units and formations in Vermont